Trana is a comune in the Metropolitan City of Turin in the northern Italian region Piedmont.

Trana may also refer to:

 Gabriela Traña, a Costa Rican long-distance runner
 John Marius Trana, a Norwegian trade unionist and politician for the Labour Party
 Tom Trana, a Swedish motor rally driver